Donald Armin Blome is an American diplomat serving as the United States Ambassador to Pakistan since 2022. He also served as the United States Ambassador to Tunisia from 2019 to 2022.

Early life and education 
Blome received a Bachelor of Arts and a Juris Doctor from the University of Michigan.

Career 
Prior to joining the government, Blome worked as an attorney in Chicago, Illinois.

Blome is a career member of the Senior Foreign Service, with the rank of Minister-Counselor; he has served since 1993. He previously served as the U.S. Ambassador to Tunisia. Prior to that, he served as Chargé d’Affaires a.i. at the Libya External Office in Tunis, Tunisia. He also served as Consul General at the U.S. Consulate in Jerusalem, and Director, Office of Arabian Peninsula Affairs at the U.S. Department of State. Blome served as Political Counselor, Embassy Kabul, Afghanistan and as Minister-Counselor for Economic and Political Affairs at the U.S. Embassy in Cairo, Egypt. Before this, Blome served as the Civilian Co-Director, Multinational Force Strategic Engagement Cell, Baghdad, Political Counselor, Embassy Kuwait, and as Israel Desk Officer, Deputy Director and Acting Director, Office of Israel and Palestinian Affairs.

United States Ambassador to Tunisia 
In August 2018, President Donald Trump nominated Blome to serve as U.S. Ambassador to Tunisia. His nomination was confirmed in the United States Senate by voice vote on January 2, 2019. He was sworn into office on January 9, 2019. He presented his credentials to President Beji Caid Essebsi on February 7, 2019.

United States Ambassador to Pakistan
On October 19, 2021, President Joe Biden nominated Blome to be the next United States Ambassador to Pakistan. The Senate Foreign Relations Committee held hearings on Blome's nomination on December 14, 2021. The committee favorably reported his nomination to the Senate floor on January 12, 2022. The Senate confirmed Blome's nomination on March 1, 2022 by voice vote. He was sworn into office on April 11, 2022, and he arrived in the country on May 23, 2022. He presented his credentials on July 1, 2022.

Personal life
Blome is fluent in Arabic.

See also 
 Ambassadors of the United States

References

External links

Living people
20th-century American diplomats
21st-century American diplomats
Ambassadors of the United States to Tunisia
Ambassadors of the United States to Pakistan
Lawyers from Chicago
Trump administration personnel
University of Michigan Law School alumni
University of Michigan alumni
Year of birth missing (living people)
Place of birth missing (living people)
United States Foreign Service personnel